Fox Chase is a census-designated place in Muhlenberg Township, Berks County, Pennsylvania, United States.  It is located approximately four miles north of the city of Reading along the Schuylkill River.  As of the 2010 census, the population was 1,622 residents.

References

Census-designated places in Berks County, Pennsylvania
Census-designated places in Pennsylvania